Grand Cinema is a 1989 Iranian comedy film directed by Hassan Hedayat. It was entered into the 16th Moscow International Film Festival.

Cast
 Ebrahim Abadi
 Akbar Abdi
 Fereydoon Aboo Zia
 Morteza Ahmadi
 Hosein Amirfazli
 Mahmoud Basiri
 Akbar Doodkar
 Maliheh Ebrahimi
 Ezzatolah Entezami as Aghaiev
 Nasser Laghayi
 Yoosef Samad Zadeh

References

External links
 

1989 films
1989 comedy films
Iranian comedy films
1980s Persian-language films